Kyle Mosher (born 1985), also known as I'm not a crook, is a Canadian-born Charlotte, North Carolina-based artist and designer known for his collage and cut-paper style.

Artwork

Mosher's artwork combines lyrical epigrams from famous musicians most often in the hip-hop genre. His recognizable collage and cut-paper style combines found imagery through both digital and traditional techniques such as painting and printmaking. It contains graphic images which are worn, used, or made to feel vintage in nature. Subjects are often, but not limited to: birds, flowers, vintage cars, small children, the elderly, fire hydrants, fans, pillow cases, and various other images that seem to be visual conundrums.

Mosher's work borrows heavily from Modern artists like Cézanne, Picasso, Braque, and Rauschenberg, and shares similarities with contemporary Brazilian artist Eduardo Recife (aka Misprinted Type). His work captures the world around him as interpreted through a combination of traditional simple forms, loose illustrative styles, and the use of modern graphic imagery.

Early years

Before becoming an artist, Mosher was a competitive athlete who played hockey while attending Nashua High School in Nashua, New Hampshire. Plagued by injuries prior to leaving for college, Mosher decided to pursue art instead and enrolled at the New Hampshire Institute of Art (NHIA) in the illustration program. At NHIA, Mosher earned his Bachelor of Fine Arts (B.F.A.) in Illustration where he studied with Lynn Pauley. It was also at NHIA where Mosher first became inspired by Cézanne's observations of simple forms, Picasso's synthetic cubism, and Rauschenberg's mixed media collages.

While at NHIA, Mosher also had the opportunity to study in Florence, Italy in 2007, at which point he started to combine cut-paper techniques into his illustrations. In 2008 his illustration "Audubon 2" was selected as one of 96 winning student works from around the country featured in an exhibit at the Society of Illustrators Gallery in New York City.

Career

Mosher's work is strongly influenced by his connection to music, especially hip-hop, and he frequently combines lyrics from hip-hop artists with visual images in his trademark mixed-media style. Lyrics chosen are usually intended to motivate, inspire, or make a statement.

Mosher's commercial work is visually more literal. For example, a recent series entitled "The Portrait Series" features portraits of musicians created using his signature cut-paper and collage style.

He has also been profiled on Juice Online, Perfectionist Wannabe, the Fearless Entrepreneur, and the Charlotte-based National Public Radio (NPR) station WFAE.

Kyle Mosher currently resides in Charlotte, North Carolina.

References

External links
 Kyle Mosher's official website
 Society of Illustrators, New York City
 The Phase Collective
 Proteus Mag

American multimedia artists
Canadian multimedia artists
Artists from Boston
Artists from Quebec
People from Nashua, New Hampshire
People from Sherbrooke
Living people
1985 births
Artists from New Hampshire
Canadian collage artists